Adam J. Satchell is an American politician and educator who served as a Democratic member of the Rhode Island Senate for the 9th district from January 2013 until 2021 and is the current dean of students for West Warwick High School.

Early life and education
Satchell was born and raised in Rhode Island. He attended, and graduated from, West Warwick High School in 1999. He earned his Bachelor of Arts in psychology from Merrimack College and his Master of Arts from Rhode Island College.

Elections
2012 Satchell challenged District 9 incumbent Senator Michael Pinga in the September 11, 2012 Democratic Primary, winning with 1,151 votes (58.0%), and won the November 6, 2012 General election with 6,618 votes (65.4%) against Republican nominee Paul Caianiello, who had run for the seat in 2008.
Satchel did not seek re-election in 2020.

Current life
As of 2022, Satchell is the dean of students at West Warwick High School.

References

External links
Official page at the Rhode Island General Assembly
Campaign site
Adam J. Satchell at Ballotpedia
Adam J. Satchell at OpenSecrets

Place of birth missing (living people)
Living people
Merrimack College alumni
People from West Warwick, Rhode Island
Rhode Island College alumni
Democratic Party Rhode Island state senators
21st-century American politicians
1981 births
West Warwick High School alumni